The Mayor of the Narayanganj City is the chief executive of the Narayanganj City Corporation. The Mayor's office administers all city services, public property, most public agencies, and enforces all city and state laws within Narayanganj city.

The Mayor's office is located in Nagar Bhaban; it has jurisdiction over all 27 wards of Narayanganj City..

List of officeholders

Elections

Election Result 2022

Election Result 2016

Election Result 2011

References